The Hon. Sir Gerald Alfred Thesiger MBE (25 December 1902 – 16 April 1981) was a judge of the High Court of England and Wales of the Queen's Bench Division between 1958 and 1978.

Early life and education
Thesiger was born on Christmas Day 1902 in Holyport, Berkshire. He was the son of Major-General George Handcock Thesiger and his wife, Frances Fremantle, daughter of General Fitzroy William Fremantle. He was educated at Gresham's School, Holt, Magdalen College,  Oxford (1922–1925), and the Inner Temple.

Thesiger's grandfather was Lt.-General the Hon. Charles Wemyss Thesiger, a younger son of a Lord Chancellor, Frederic Thesiger, 1st Baron Chelmsford. The British general Frederic Thesiger, 2nd Baron Chelmsford, and the judge Alfred Henry Thesiger (one of the youngest Lords Justices of Appeal in history) were his great-uncles.

Career
In 1926, he was called to the Bar as a barrister. He was appointed Recorder of Rye in 1937.

During World War II, he was commissioned as a Major in the Office of the Judge Advocate General, and was appointed Recorder of Hastings in 1942. He entered local government in London, initially as a member of Fulham Borough Council from 1934 to 1937 and then of Chelsea Borough Council from 1937 to 1958. He was Mayor of Chelsea from 1944 to 1946. He took silk as a King's Counsel in 1948 and was appointed Recorder of Southend-on-Sea in 1952. He became a Bencher of the Inner Temple in 1956 and served as a High Court Judge of the Queen's Bench Division between 1958 and 1978.

Personal life
On 28 July 1932, Thesiger married Marjorie Ellen Guille, daughter of Raymond Guille of Long Island, New York, and they had three daughters, Oonah Caroline Thesiger (born 1936), Virginia Mary (born 1941, died 1972), and Juliet Elizabeth (born 1943).

Honours
Member of the Order of the British Empire, 1946
Knight, 1958
President of the British Academy of Forensic Sciences

Publications
The Judge and the Expert Witness in Medicine,Science and the Law, 1975, volume 15

References

1902 births
1981 deaths
Alumni of Magdalen College, Oxford
20th-century English judges
English King's Counsel
Knights Bachelor
Mayors of places in Greater London
Members of the Order of the British Empire
People educated at Gresham's School
Queen's Bench Division judges
20th-century King's Counsel
Members of Chelsea Metropolitan Borough Council
Gerald